Adult Learning Wales is a registered charity and adult education provider serving the whole of Wales.

History
The present body was formed on the merger of Workers' Educational Association WEA Cymru and YMCA Community College on 1 August 2015, and adopted the present name in November 2016. WEA Cymru was itself a product of a recent merger, when on 10 January 2014 WEA South Wales joined with Coleg Harlech WEA (North).

WEA (South Wales)
The Workers’ Educational Association WEA in South Wales traces its roots to a conference at Cory Hall in Cardiff in October 1906 initiated by Albert Mansbridge, with representatives of local authorities, trade unions and the university college. Twelve branches were formed between 1907 and 1914, bringing adult education to working people primarily in Glamorgan and Monmouthshire. The network continued to expand after the Great War under the leadership of secretary John Davies.

Coleg Harlech WEA (North)

Workers’ education in North Wales began as classes in quarries under the auspices of the University College of North Wales. From 1925, a new North Wales district of the WEA was set up, with R. Silyn Roberts as its first District Secretary. By 1927 classes in existence had trebled, providing for 1250 adults. After Silyn’s early death in 1930, his widow, Mary Silyn Roberts, succeeded him as Secretary, also a lecturer, and the association continued to grow, with over 3,000 learners by the 1940s. 
Coleg Harlech was founded in 1927 by Thomas Jones, Cabinet Secretary to both David Lloyd George and Stanley Baldwin, to continue the work of WEA in a residential environment.

On 1 August 2001, the Workers’ Educational Association (North Wales) and Coleg Harlech merged to form Coleg Harlech WEA (North). The merged Association continued the common longstanding tradition of liberal arts adult education to enable adults to develop their capacity to learn and fulfil their potential, but also continued to enlarge this by developing vocational education and training, including providing opportunities for socially and educationally disadvantaged adults both in residence at Harlech and in communities and workplaces across North and Mid Wales.

WEA publications
In its heyday, the WEA in Wales published ‘’The Highway’’ in English, and ‘’Lleufer’’ in Welsh, the latter under the editorship of David Thomas.

YMCA Community College
YMCA Community College was an independent body linked to the wider YMCA movement. It provided adult education, mostly to male learners, often vulnerable people, including ex-offenders and youth workers, across the whole of Wales.

Adult education provision
Adult Learning Wales/Addysg Oedolion Cymru has a presence across Wales. It provides adult education throughout Wales, sometimes in its own buildings, but often at third-party premises, as required.

Governance
The Association is a registered charity with the Charity Commission (registration number 1071234) and a company limited by guarantee (company number 3109524), governed by a Council of trustees.  It is a membership based organisation at £10 per annum. Students, former students, staff and other people wishing to support the Association are particularly encouraged to apply. There is a branch network throughout Wales.
The main source of funding is the Welsh Government as a designated institution under the Further and Higher Education Act 1992.
Since renaming as Adult Learning Wales - Addysg Oedolion Cymru, the organisation additionally retains the branding of predecessor institutions.

References
Notes

Bibliography
 J. England (ed.) (2007). Changing Lives: Workers’ Education in Wales 1907–2007, 
P. Stead (1977). Coleg Harlech: The First Fifty Years, 
E. White (1977). Thomas Jones: Founder of Coleg Harlech,

External links
 Official Website

Further education colleges in Wales
Adult education in the United Kingdom